R63 may refer to:

Roads 
 R63 expressway (Czech Republic)
 R63 (South Africa)

Other uses 
 , a destroyer of the Royal Navy
 , an aircraft carrier of the Royal Navy
 R63: Possible risk of harm to the unborn child, a risk phrase
 a size of light bulb reflector